Union Sportive Carcassonnaise are a French rugby union club based in Carcassonne. US Carcassonne currently compete in the Pro D2 of French rugby. The club was established in 1899. They play in black and yellow colours and at the Stade Albert Domec. Carcassonne have contested one French championship final in their history; losing to USA Perpignan in 1925.

Honours
 French championship:
 Runners-up: 1925
Fédérale 1 championship;
 Champions: 2010
Fédérale 2 championship:
 Champions: 2008
 Deuxième Division:
 Champions: 1975
 Troisième Division:
 Champions: 1966
 Honneur (4e div):
 Champions: 1951

Finals results

French championship

Current standings

Current squad

The Carcassonne squad for the 2022–23 season is:

Espoirs squad

Notable former players

 Shalva Mamukashvili
 Antoine Blain
 Jules Cadenat
 Albert Domec
 Firmin Raynaud
 Jean Sébédio
 Guy Vassal
 Romuald Laouvéa

See also
 List of rugby union clubs in France
 Rugby union in France

References

External links
  US Carcassonne Official website
 Itsrugby.co.uk team profile

Carcassonne
Rugby clubs established in 1899
Carcassonne
Sport in Aude